Mario Méndez Olagüe (born 1 June 1979) is a Mexican former professional footballer who played as a right-back.

Career
Mario Méndez started his career with Club Atlas in the year 1998, in the golden age that included many (at the time, promising) players like Rafael Márquez, Daniel Osorno, Juan Pablo Rodriguez and Miguel Zepeda. With Atlas he got a sub-championship in the year of 1999 having been a vital part in the defense. He stayed with this club until 2004. In 2004 Mario Mendéz was bought by Deportivo Toluca F.C., where he was an important player in the squad playing 49 games and scoring one goal.

Later on Méndez was sent to Monterrey to play for the Rayados of Monterrey. Unfortunately, he did not have much time on the field as he was on the Mexico national team in the 2005 FIFA Confederations Cup.
Later that year he was transferred to Tigres on 29 May 2006. He previously played for Tigres arch-rival Rayados of Monterrey, but was playing there only on loan, and was signed with Club Toluca who negotiated the transference with Tigres.

He was called up to the Mexico national team to participate in the 2006 World Cup. He started for Mexico's first two games against Iran, Angola and later, in the Elimination Round of 16 against Argentina. In the game against Iran he made an assist in the goal of Zihna. Although he had been criticized for his occasional careless plays and teamwork abilities on the national team, he continuesd to be one of Mexico's important talented players.

During the Winter Transfer period, Ricardo Lavolpe, head coach of the Argentinen Vélez Sársfield, called on the talents of Mario Méndez for Vélez Sársfield

After Lavolpe's resignation as coach Mendez returned to Mexico, joining Club Toluca.

During the Hugo Sanchez era, Mendez was not called up for Mexico. Méndez returned to the team under the new manager Sven-Göran Eriksson. He appeared in the September 2008 friendly match against Chile (a 1–0 defeat), coming on as a substitute for Jaime Correa Córdoba.
He was loaned out to CD Irapuato on 12 June 2011 after being transferred from Club Toluca. He retired in 2013.

Honours
Toluca
Mexican Primera División: Apertura 2008

Mexico
CONCACAF Gold Cup: 2003

Career Statistics

International goals

References

External links 
 
 Football Database.com provides Mario Méndez's profile and stats

1979 births
Living people
Mexico international footballers
Mexico under-20 international footballers
Footballers from Guadalajara, Jalisco
CONCACAF Gold Cup-winning players
2003 CONCACAF Gold Cup players
2004 Copa América players
2005 FIFA Confederations Cup players
2005 CONCACAF Gold Cup players
2006 FIFA World Cup players
Liga MX players
Argentine Primera División players
Atlas F.C. footballers
Deportivo Toluca F.C. players
C.F. Monterrey players
Tigres UANL footballers
Irapuato F.C. footballers
Mexican expatriate footballers
Mexican footballers
Mexican expatriate sportspeople in Argentina
Expatriate footballers in Argentina
Club Atlético Vélez Sarsfield footballers
Association football defenders